John Richard Jordison (born 18 June 1981) is an English cricketer.  Jordison is a right-handed batsman who bowls right-arm medium pace.  He was born at Nottingham, Nottinghamshire.

Jordison represented the Derbyshire Cricket Board in two List A matches against Wiltshire and Cambridgeshire in the 2001 Cheltenham & Gloucester Trophy. In his two List A matches, he took 2 wickets at a bowling average of 31.50, with best figures of 2/27. In 2002, he represented CUCCE in a single first-class match against Middlesex. In his only first-class match, he scored 28 runs at a batting average of 14.00, with a high score of 27.  With the ball he took a single wicket at an average of 96.00, with best figures of 1/61.

References

External links
John Jordison at Cricinfo
John Jordison at CricketArchive

1981 births
Living people
Cricketers from Nottingham
English cricketers
Derbyshire Cricket Board cricketers
Cambridge MCCU cricketers